Hünkârbeğendi, or simply beğendi (literally, 'the sultan liked it'), is an eggplant and lamb dish in Ottoman cuisine.

It is made from eggplant grilled until the skin is burned, giving it a smoky flavor. The eggplant is puréed, seasoned, and thickened with béchamel sauce. The mixture is then topped with cubes of sauteed or grilled lamb.

References

Turkish cuisine
Ottoman cuisine
Lamb dishes
Eggplant dishes